The Girls in My Town: Essays is a 2016 collection of essays written by Angela Morales, published by the University of New Mexico Press. It won the River Teeth Nonfiction Book Prize and the PEN Diamonstein-Spielvogel Award for the Art of the Essay.

References

2016 non-fiction books
University of New Mexico Press books
Books by Angela Morales
American essay collections